Hexshogi is a shogi variant for two players created by George R. Dekle Sr. in 1986. The gameboard comprises 85 hexagonal cells. The game is in all respects the same as shogi, except that piece moves have been transfigured for the hexagonal board-cell geometry.

Hexshogi was included in World Game Review No. 10 edited by Michael Keller.

Game rules 
Hexshogi has the same types and numbers of pieces as shogi, and all normal shogi rules apply, including a similar initial setup (see diagram), drops, promotion, check, checkmate, and impasse. As in shogi, pieces capture the same as they move. But the hexagonal geometry implies special move patterns for the pieces.

Piece moves 
The diagrams show how the unpromoted pieces move. As in shogi, a dragon king (promoted rook) moves as a rook, or as a king. A dragon horse (promoted bishop) moves as a bishop or a king.

See also 
 Gliński's hexagonal chess
 Also by George Dekle:
 Trishogi – a variant with triangular cells
 Masonic Shogi
 Space Shogi – a 3D variant

Notes

References 

Bibliography

External links 
 Hex Shogi variants by Fergus Duniho, The Chess Variant Pages

Board games introduced in 1986
Abstract strategy games
Shogi variants